Rezső  is a Hungarian masculine given name. It may refer to:

Rezső Bálint (painter) (1885–1945), Hungarian painter known for his landscape paintings
Rezső Bálint (physician) (1874–1929), Austro-Hungarian neurologist and psychiatrist who discovered Balint's syndrome
Rezső Crettier (born 1878), Hungarian track and field athlete
Rezső Kende (1908–2011), Hungarian gymnast who competed at the 1928 Summer Olympics in Amsterdam
Rezső Nyers (1923–2018), former Hungarian politician, who served as Minister of Finance between 1960 and 1962
Rezső Seress IPA (1889–1968), Hungarian pianist and composer
Rezső Somlai (born 1911), Hungarian footballer, who was in Hungary squad at the 1934 FIFA World Cup
Rezső Sugár (1919–1988), Hungarian composer
Rezső von Bartha (1912–2001), Hungarian fencer and modern pentathlete
Rezső Wanié (1908–1986), Hungarian swimmer

References

Hungarian masculine given names